S/2007 S 3 is a natural satellite of Saturn. Its discovery was announced by Scott S. Sheppard, David C. Jewitt, Jan Kleyna, and Brian G. Marsden on 1 May 2007 from observations taken between 18 January and 19 April 2007.

S/2007 S 3 is about 5 kilometres in diameter, and orbits Saturn at an average distance of 19,429,000 kilometres in about 1,011 days, at an inclination of 176.6° to the ecliptic, in a retrograde direction and with an eccentricity of 0.143.

This moon was considered lost until its recovery was announced on 12 October 2022.

References

 Institute for Astronomy Saturn Satellite Data
 MPEC 2007-J09: S/2007 S 2, S/2007 S 3, 1 May 2007 (discovery and ephemeris)

Norse group
Moons of Saturn
Irregular satellites
Discoveries by Scott S. Sheppard
Astronomical objects discovered in 2007
Moons with a retrograde orbit